John Dewar (6 January 1805 – 22 January 1880) was a Scottish businessman from Perth who founded the John Dewar & Sons Scotch whisky distillery in 1846.

Personal life 
In 1845, Dewar married Jane Gow, with whom he had the following children:
 John (1849–1852)
 Agnes (1850–1852)
 James Gow (1852–1922)
 Alexander (1854–1855)
 John Alexander (1856–1929)
 Charles (1858–1933)
 Arthur (1860–1917)
 Thomas Robert (1864–1930)

On his death, sons Tommy and John took over management of the business.

Death 
Dewar died in 1880, aged 74. He was interred in Perth's Wellshill Cemetery. His wife survived him by twenty years and was buried beside him.

References
Specific

General
 Burke's Landed Gentry – The Kingdom of Scotland 19th Edition, Volume I  

1805 births
1880 deaths
19th-century Scottish businesspeople
John Sr.

People from Perth, Scotland